The Aureole Hills are a pair of smooth, conical, ice-covered hills, the higher reaching to , standing close west of the north end of Detroit Plateau, Trinity Peninsula on Antarctica. The descriptive name was given by the Falkland Islands Dependencies Survey following its survey of 1948.

Map
 Trinity Peninsula. Scale 1:250000 topographic map No. 5697. Institut für Angewandte Geodäsie and British Antarctic Survey, 1996.

References
 

Hills of Trinity Peninsula